Valur may refer to:

People
 Birkir Valur Jónsson (born 1998), Icelandic football player
 Björn Valur Gíslason (born 1959), Icelandic politician
 Guðjón Valur Sigurðsson (born 1979), Icelandic handball player
 Guðni Valur Guðnason (born 1995), Icelandic discus thrower
 Kristján Valur Ingólfsson (born 1947), Icelandic priest
 Valur Gíslason (born 1977), Icelandic football player
 Valur Ingimundarson (born 1962), Icelandic basketball player and coach
 Valur Orri Valsson (born 1994), Icelandic basketball player
 Valur Valsson (born 1961), Icelandic football player

Places
 Válur, Faroe Islands

Sports
 Knattspyrnufélagið Valur, Icelandic multi-sport club often simply called Valur
 Teams within Valur:
 Valur men's football
 Valur women's football
 Valur men's handball
 Valur women's handball
 Valur men's basketball
 Valur women's basketball
 Valur Reyðarfirði, former club that merged into Knattspyrnufélag Fjarðabyggðar